The 2004 Campeonato Mineiro de Futebol do Módulo I was the 90th season of Minas Gerais's top-flight professional football league. The season began on January 21 and ended on April 18. Cruzeiro won the title for the 33rd time.

Participating teams

League table

Final Tournament

Finals

First leg

Second leg

References 

Campeonato Mineiro seasons
Mineiro